Raphaël Gérard (born 17 October 1968) is a French politician of La République En Marche (LREM) who has been a member of the French National Assembly since 2017, where he represents the 4th constituency of Charente-Maritime.

Early life and education
In 1992, Gérard obtained his diploma in Art History at the École du Louvre, with a specialty in ancient and Christian iconography, then a year later in Museology. In 2002, he took over the management of the Musée de Montmartre in Paris, where he produced several major exhibitions, such as a first retrospective devoted to Théophile Alexandre Steinlen in 2005. In 2006, he joined the LVMH group and the heritage department of the Louis Vuitton trunk maker where he was responsible for international exhibitions.

In 2012, Gérard moved to the south of Charente-Maritime, in Lonzac, and became responsible for the heritage and cultural activities of Hennessy.

Member of the National Assembly 
On 18 June 2017, Gérard was elected in the 15th constituency of the Nord by obtaining 51.29% of votes in the second round against the LR 's candidat.

In the National Assembly, Gérard serves on the Commission for Cultural Affairs and Education. In addition to his committee assignments, he chairs the Heritage Study group and the France-Indonesia Friendship Group. He is also Vice-Président of the Discrimination and LGBT-phobias worldwide's Study group.

Political positions
In July 2019, Gérard voted in favor of the French ratification of the European Union’s Comprehensive Economic and Trade Agreement (CETA) with Canada.

Personal life
Gérard is married. On 20 June 2018, on the occasion of the presentation of his report on the fight against anti-LGBT discrimination in Overseas, came out publicly as gay.

On 12 March 2020, Gérard tested positive for Covid-19. On 14 March 2020, he was placed in intensive care.

See also
 2017 French legislative election

References

1968 births
Living people
Deputies of the 15th National Assembly of the French Fifth Republic
La République En Marche! politicians
Gay politicians
LGBT legislators in France
Deputies of the 16th National Assembly of the French Fifth Republic